The 2008–09 season is the 105th season of competitive football in Turkey.

Managerial changes

Uefa competitions

UEFA Champions League

Group stage

Group G

UEFA Europa League

Group stage

Group B

National team

Transfer deals

Retirements
Mert Korkmaz

References

 
Seasons in Turkish football
Turkish 2008